Jeb Livingood is an American essayist, short story writer, editor, and academic.

Life 
He graduated from University of Virginia, American University, George Mason University, and University of Virginia, with an M.F.A. in 2000.

He exhibited at the 1999 Association of Writers & Writing Programs Conference in Albany, New York.

He teaches at the University of Virginia, where he is faculty advisor for Meridian.
He is the series editor for the Best New Poets anthology.

He is a commander in the U.S. Coast Guard Reserve.

Awards 
 2002 A.E. Coppard Prize for Long Fiction 
 2001 Finalist Jack Dyer Fiction Prize

Works 
 “To Us,” CreamCity Review, Spring 2004.
 "Motion Sickness," The Texas Review, Fall/Winter 2002.
 "Signal Codes" White House Coffee Store Press, November 2002. ASIN: B000CBS0O0 Chapbook
 "Charles Baxter: Fiction Resisting the Corilineal," The Hollins Critic, October 2000.
 "From the Pilot to the Bombardier: An Anecdote on Literary Fame," The Texas Review, Spring/Summer 2001.
 "Oh Albany, My Love," C-ville, March 21, 2000.
 "Overnight Sensation, 1974," Writer's Eye, 1999.
 "The Summer Sea," Yemassee, Spring/Summer 1998.

Anthologies
 Charles Baxter, John Kulka, Natalie Danford, ed (2001). Best new American voices 2001. Harcourt. .

Editor 
 George P. Garrett, Jeb Livingood, ed (2005). Best New Poets, 2005. Samovar Press. .
 Eric Pankey, Jeb Livingood, ed (2006). Best New Poets, 2006. Samovar Press. .
 Natasha Trethewey, Jeb Livingood, ed (2007). Best New Poets, 2007. Samovar Press. .
 Mark Strand, Jeb Livingood, ed (2008). Best New Poets, 2008: 50 Poems from Emerging Writers. Samovar Press. .
 Kim Addonizio, Jeb Livingood, ed (2009). Best New Poets, 2009: 50 Poems from Emerging Writers. Samovar Press. .
 George Garrett, Going to see the elephant: pieces of a writing life, Jeb Livingood ed, Texas Review Press, 2002,

Essay 
 "Revenge of the Introverts", Computer-Mediated Communication Magazine, Volume 2, Number 4, April 1, 1995

References 

Living people
American editors
University of Virginia faculty
University of Virginia alumni
George Mason University alumni
American essayists
American short story writers
Year of birth missing (living people)